Agyneta transversa is a species of sheet weaver found in Mexico. It was described by Banks in 1898.

References

transversa
Endemic spiders of Mexico
Spiders described in 1898